KD Syarif Masahor is the second ship of Maharaja Lela-class frigate built locally by Boustead Heavy Industries Corporation (BHIC). She build based on enlarged version of Naval Group's Gowind-class design. The ship named after Syarif Masahor, in honour of the Sarawak warrior during British colonialism.

Development
Under a contract valued of RM9 billion, BHIC was contracted to built a total of six class of this ship for RMN. Like her sister ships, Syarif Masahor has a length of 111 metres, a beam of 16 metres and a draught of 3.85 metres. The ship has displacement of 3100 tonnes and a complement of 138. As for the weapon systems, she equipped with one Bofors 57 mm gun and two MSI DS30M 30 mm cannon. There was 16 Sylver VLS allocated on the deck of the ship for the surface-to-air missile and 8 Naval Strike Missile anti-ship missile for anti surface warfare. For the anti-submarine capabilities, the ship equipped with two J+S fixed triple torpedo launcher.

References

Maharaja Lela